Wesley H. Coffyn (August 7, 1878 – November 27, 1946) was a Canadian politician. He served in the Legislative Assembly of New Brunswick as member of the Conservative party representing Gloucester County from 1931 to 1935.

References

20th-century Canadian legislators
1878 births
1947 deaths
Progressive Conservative Party of New Brunswick MLAs